Yee Whye Teh is a professor of Statistical Machine Learning in the Department of Statistics at the University of Oxford. Prior to 2012 he was a reader at the Gatsby Computational Neuroscience Unit at University College London. His work is primarily in machine learning.

Research 
He was one of the original developers of deep belief networks and of hierarchical Dirichlet processes.

Honors 

He was a keynote lecturer at UAI 2019, and was invited to give the Breiman lecture at NeurIPS 2017 (formerly known as NIPS), on the topic Bayesian Deep Learning and Deep Bayesian Learning. He was program co-chair of ICML 2017, one of the premier conferences in machine learning.

External links 

 Homepage

Living people
Artificial intelligence researchers
Machine learning researchers
Year of birth missing (living people)